Shout! Factory is an American home video and music company founded in 2002 as Retropolis Entertainment. Its video releases include previously released feature films, classic and contemporary television series, animation, live music, and comedy specials. Shout! Factory also owns and operates Shout! Studios, Westchester Films, Timeless Media Group, Biograph Records, Majordomo Records, and Video Time Machine.

History 
Retropolis Entertainment was founded in April 2002 by Bob Emmer, Garson Foos, and Richard Foos, three principals from Rhino Records, as the company was negotiating with the five majors for distribution. After selling Rhino to Warner Bros., the three set out to launch a new retro pop culture label. The company's first product was Red, White & Rock, a joint release with PBS station WQED-TV that was produced with Warner Strategic Marketing. In August 2002, Retropolis acquired Biograph Records. Other early releases included blues and jazz CDs from the Biograph label, a Fats Domino CD and DVD, and several documentaries (Superstar: The Life And Times of Andy Warhol, What Happened To Kerouac?). Retropolis was renamed Shout! Factory in April 2003. At that time, Shout had signed a press and distribution agreement with Sony Music Entertainment. In 2004, Shout! released Freaks and Geeks on DVD, the first television series released on DVD for the company. With 18 episodes, it became one of the most expensive DVDs to produce, costing over a million dollars in music licensing. That same year, they released William Shatner's album Has Been and SCTV box sets.

In 2004, Shout! Factory released an expanded two-disc version of Jim Croce's first record, the Facets album. In 2004, Shout! purchased the rights to the animated series Home Movies and released each season set, and ultimately a complete series box. Other notable releases included a pair of The Electric Company multidisc sets, the re-envisioned Herb Alpert's Whipped Cream & Other Delights Rewhipped, a series of Elvira's Movie Macabre DVDs and the first of what would be three cover CDs with Matthew Sweet and Susanna Hoffs, called Under The Covers Vol. 1; Sweet himself was also added as a featured solo artist. Shout! acquired the rights to several other television series like Punky Brewster, The Weird Al Show, and America's Funniest Home Videos.

In 2005, Shout! Factory obtained the rights to Herb Alpert's catalog, launching the Herb Alpert Signature Series of CDs. These included The Lonely Bull, South of the Border, Lost Treasures, Whipped Cream & Other Delights and others. They also got the rights to talk show host Dick Cavett's library and started releasing theme sets focused on rock icons, Ray Charles (including all his visits to the show), John Lennon and Yoko Ono, and others. They also jumped into children's animation with a deal with DIC Entertainment. C.O.P.S. The Animated Series and Heathcliff And the Catillac Cats were the first releases from that deal. On the sports side, they entered into a licensing deal with Major League Baseball, releasing themed and World Series DVDs through 2010 and then again from 2016 till present.

By 2007, classic TV on DVD was a major focus, with season sets of Blossom McHale's Navy and Ironside, an authorized collection of The Adventures of Ozzie and Harriet, and themed and actor-specific editions of Inside the Actors Studio hitting shelves. Meanwhile, they also started releasing Mickey Hart's catalogs.

In March 2008, Shout! bought the Hightone Records catalog and added artists Tom Russell, Joe Ely, and Rosie Flores to its brand. At the same time, the company was ramping up its place as a children's animation destination and continuing with a TV on DVD schedule. It took over the Mystery Science Theater 3000 DVD series and released a 20th Anniversary set and have continued to put out box sets of episodes never before released on DVD.

In 2009, Shout! reached another milestone when it struck a deal with children's TV producers Hasbro, releasing the original Transformers and G.I. Joe animated-series box sets. That same year, it released the first My Little Pony DVD, My Little Pony: Twinkle Wish Collection. Shout! continued to release several Hasbro properties, including the series My Little Pony: Friendship is Magic, until January 1, 2019, when it released its last DVD for that series, Hearts and Hooves.

In 2011, Shout! Factory made another landmark deal when they struck a deal with Nickelodeon to release the live action sitcom Hey Dude and the animated Nicktoons Rocko's Modern Life, Aaahh!!! Real Monsters, Hey Arnold!, The Angry Beavers, CatDog, The Wild Thornberrys, The Adventures of Jimmy Neutron, Boy Genius, and Danny Phantom.

In May 2012, Shout! Factory signed an agreement with Saban Capital Group to distribute the Beetleborgs, Ninja Turtles: The Next Mutation, Power Rangers and VR Troopers catalogs. It also started releasing titles by Marvel (Super Hero Squad Show, Marvel Knights). In the same month, the company acquired Oregon-based home entertainment company Timeless Media Group, adding more programs to its expanding catalog, such as The Red Skelton Show, Peter Gunn, The Gene Autry Show, The Virginian, Wagon Train, Laramie, and The Roy Rogers Show, among others.

In June 2012, Shout! Factory announced a horror label called Scream Factory, specializing in classic and cult horror films on discs such as Halloween II, Halloween III: Season of the Witch, They Live, The Howling, Lifeforce, Deadly Eyes, and others. The horror titles, both new and old, were licensed from major studios such as MGM, Fox, and Universal. In mid-June 2012, Shout! and Fred Seibert acquired Video Time Machine, a year and genre media-based iOS app, from Original Victories Inc.

In July 2013, Shout! Factory acquired the U.S. and Canadian distribution rights to the ITC Entertainment library as part of a deal with ITV Studios Global Entertainment.

2014–present 
In 2014, the success Shout! was having with complete-series box sets of such series as All in the Family, Route 66, and Barney Miller extended to such properties as The Bob Newhart Show, Hill Street Blues, and a Blu-Ray release of Pee-Wee's Playhouse and The Jeffersons. On May 8, 2014, Shout! announced their acquisition of the rights to WKRP in Cincinnati, with the intention of restoring all four seasons of the show "complete" (i.e. complete as legally possible) with their original musical scores. The 2014 release was a monumental event for fans of the show since the original DVD release in 2007 had been mired in squabbles regarding music rights. That same year, Shout! became the distributor of Super Sentai in North America. Beginning the following year, Shout! released Kyōryū Sentai Zyuranger under the name "Super Sentai Zyuranger: The Complete Series" with English subtitles.. In October, Shout! acquired Westchester Films, an independent film company whose library includes the films of John Cassavetes, Elia Kazan, and Orson Welles, as well as some early United Artists films that were previously owned by the films' producers.

IFC Midnight signed with Scream Factory by February 2015 for home distribution. On February 5, 2015, Shout! Factory launched its flagship TV ad-supported streaming services online and via Roku. Available shows and movies included 16 Werner Herzog films, Roger Corman cult films and TV shows including Father Knows Best and It's Garry Shandling's Show. In June, a minority stake in the company was taken by Cinedigm, while extending their home entertainment platform distribution agreement. Cinedigm and Shout would then relaunch the Factory's streaming service and cross market each other streaming services.

On November 10, 2015, Shout! announced that it had acquired the rights to Mystery Science Theater 3000 from Best Brains Inc. and launched a "Bring Back MST3K" Kickstarter with the goal of producing up to 12 new feature-length episodes of the series, with series creator Joel Hodgson serving as executive producer. In January 2016, Concord Bicycle Music bought the Hightone from the company. The same year, Shout! Factory had released The Crush of 1993 under subsidiary brand Scream Factory and Long Way North.

The following year, Shout! (via its Westchester Films division) acquired the domestic rights to the entire library of Morgan Creek Productions (with the exception of the original Young Guns, which is still owned by Lionsgate, successor to the film's international distributor, Vestron Pictures).

On January 10, 2017, Shout Factory acquired the worldwide television format and ancillary rights to Starcade with plans to reboot the series. On January 17, Shout! Factory announced their acquisition of the broadcast and home media distribution rights for the first three Digimon Adventure tri. films with plans for a dual-language release on DVD and Blu-ray. On May 18, Shout! Factory acquired the North American distribution rights to In This Corner of the World, with a U.S. theatrical release to take place on August 11, 2017, co-released by Funimation Films. In October 2017, it was revealed that Shout! Factory would be the distributor for GKIDS' re-releases of Studio Ghibli films formerly owned by Disney in the US (although Disney has the Asian (including Japan/China/Taiwan) distribution rights themselves, thus replacing the titles' original Japanese theatrical distributors such as Toho, Toei and Shochiku); afterwards, Shout! began distributing other GKIDS films.

On November 13, 2017, Shout! Factory announced the formation of Shout! Studios, a production and distribution arm that specializes in content development. The first films to be distributed under the new banner include Humor Me, Big Fish & Begonia (partnering with Funimation Films again for theatrical distribution) The House of Tomorrow, Izzy Gets the F*ck Across Town, and Basmati Blues, all slated for a 2018 premiere. In addition to film projects, Shout! Studios will also develop original television productions.

In March 2018, Shout! Factory acquired the New Horizons film library from its founder Roger Corman; Shout! will distribute this catalogue in North America, Europe, Russia and Australia. Shout! also expanded its U.S. and Canadian distribution deal with ITV Studios Global Entertainment to cover over 135 films and TV series from ITV's library. In August, Shout! struck a deal with Sesame Workshop to distribute the Sesame Street home video library, taking over from Warner Bros. Home Entertainment.

In February 2021, Shout! Factory made a deal with animation studio Laika to release their films on home entertainment in the US. This deal includes Laika's first four films, originally released by Focus Features, as well as brand new bonus material and packaging for each release.

In February 2022, Shout! Factory acquired the US distribution rights to the TV series ALF.

On August 9, 2022, Shout! Factory signed a worldwide distribution deal with The Jim Henson Company to bring thirteen of Henson's programmes and specials to home entertainment and streaming platforms in all territories.

Licensing deals 
, Shout! Factory has agreements with NBCUniversal, 20th Century Studios Home Entertainment (via Disney, excluding FernGully: The Last Rainforest in 2022), MGM, Sony Pictures Home Entertainment, Paramount Home Entertainment, Warner Bros. Home Entertainment, Universal Pictures Home Entertainment, Hasbro (and its subsidiary Entertainment One), GKIDS, Eleven Arts, Sesame Workshop, IFC Films, Major League Baseball, ITV Studios, CBS Home Entertainment, Motion Picture Corporation of America, The Tornante Company, the estate of Stephen J. Cannell and StudioCanal.

Releases under these agreements have included the complete Joss Whedon/John Cassaday series of Astonishing X-Men, plus Thor & Loki: Blood Brothers and Iron Man: Extremis on DVD and Blu-ray; the original Transformers, G.I. Joe, Jem and My Little Pony cartoons, My Little Pony: Friendship Is Magic, Power Rangers, VR Troopers, Sesame Street, Super Sentai, some Nickelodeon series like Rocko's Modern Life, Hey Arnold!, The Wild Thornberrys, CatDog, Danny Phantom, Hey Dude, The Angry Beavers, Aaahh!!! Real Monsters, The Adventures of Jimmy Neutron, Boy Genius (under a former agreement with Paramount Home Entertainment), and Gravity Falls (under a former agreement with Walt Disney Studios Home Entertainment).

In mid-2012, Shout! Factory announced a horror sub-label called Scream Factory, specializing in classic and cult horror films such as Halloween II, Halloween III: Season of the Witch, They Live, The Howling, Lifeforce, The Return of the Living Dead, and others being released to DVD and Blu-ray.

In July 2020, Shout! Factory announced to have struck a multi-year deal with Alliance Entertainment and Mill Creek Entertainment that granted them the exclusive SVOD and AVOD digital rights to the Ultra series, 1,100 episodes and 20 films acquired by Mill Creek the previous year. Shout! Factory will stream the catalogue in the United States and Canada through their services, Shout! Factory TV and Tokushoutsu.

Related companies 
In 2012, Shout! Factory acquired Oregon-based home entertainment company Timeless Media Group, adding programs to its ever-expanding catalog: The Red Skelton Show, Peter Gunn, The Gene Autry Show, The Virginian, Wagon Train, Laramie, and The Roy Rogers Show, among others.

Shout! Factory also acquired blues/roots label HighTone Records and continued to oversee its back catalog until 2016 when Concord Bicycle Music bought the label.

Releases

Scream Factory

Shout! Select

Shout! Factory Kids

TV series

Roger Corman's Cult Classics

Units 
 Majordomo Records – an indie record label formed as an imprint and partnership with Shout! Factory
 Roger Corman's Cult Classics – sub-label started in 2010
 Timeless Media Group – sub-label acquired in 2012
 Scream Factory – sub-label started in 2012
 Shout! Select – sub-label started in 2016
 Shout! Factory TV – streaming service
 Scream Factory TV - horror movie streaming service 
 Shout! Cult - cult movie streaming service 
 Shout! Studios – film and TV production and distribution arm started in November 2017
 Westchester Films – distributor of classic films from Orson Welles, John Cassavetes, Elia Kazan, and material once distributed by United Artists (all part of the holdings of Westchester's predecessor company Castle Hill Productions), as well as the Morgan Creek Productions and ITV Studios libraries.

References

External links 
 

 
2002 establishments in California
American companies established in 2002
Entertainment companies established in 2002
American record labels
Home video companies of the United States
Reissue record labels
Record labels established in 2002
Privately held companies based in California
Companies based in Los Angeles
Film distributors of the United States
Entertainment companies based in California